This is a list of Heritage Sites in Old Dhaka with properties of cultural and historical heritage in Bangladesh.

Notable Heritage Sites 
List of landmarks in this region:

See also 
 List of archaeological sites in Bangladesh

External links

References 

 L
Archaeology of Bangladesh
Lists of archaeological sites by country
Old Dhaka Heritage Sites
Old Dhaka Heritage Sites